Theodosia Hawkins-Magill (5 September 1743 in Brighton – 2 March 1817 in Brighton), later Countess of Clanwilliam, was a great heiress and landowner in County Down, Ireland.

Early life and family
She was the daughter and heir of Robert Hawkins-Magill (d. 10 April 1745), of Gill Hall, Dromore, County Down, by his second wife, Anne Bligh, daughter of John Bligh, 1st Earl of Darnley and Theodosia Bligh, 10th Baroness Clifton. She may have been called "Titty" by her family, as this was a pet name used for Theodosia's aunt, Lady Theodosia Bligh, who married William, 2nd Lord Brandon, in 1745.

When young, she was painted by both Reynolds and Gainsborough.

On 29 August 1765 she married John Meade (21 April 1744 – 19 October 1800, St. Stephen's Green, Dublin), son and heir of Sir Richard Meade, 3rd Baronet, of Ballintober, Co. Cork, by Catherine, daughter of Henry Prittie, of Kilboy, Co. Tipperary. Sir John Meade, 4th Baronet, was created Baron Gillford, of the manor of Gillford, Co. Down, and Viscount Clanwilliam, of Co. Tipperary, on 17 November 1766, and Earl of Clanwilliam on 20 July 1776; all in the peerage of Ireland. Previously he had been MP for Banagher, 1764–66. Between them (hers being the far greater share) their estates in 1799 were said to be worth £14,000 per annum, which made them approximately the eleventh largest landowners in Ireland.

Properties
She lived at Gill Hall and at Burrenwood, a cottage ornée put up near Castlewellan on some land halfway between her mother's house at Castle Ward (her mother had married (in December 1747) Bernard Ward after the early death of her first husband, Robert Hawkins-Magill (d. 1745); Mrs Pendarves wrote of Bernard Ward and the former Lady Anne Hawkins-Magill: 'He wants taste and Lady Anne is so whimsical that I doubt her judgement'), the Greenore Ferry, Rathfriland, and her ancestral seat at Gill Hall.

Burrenwood

Burrenwood stands between the forest parks of Tollymore and Castlewellan, beside the Mourne mountains and just inland from Dundrum bay at Newcastle. Burrenwood is comparable with the Swiss cottage at Cahir (Tipperary); Derrymore, Bessbrook, Co. Armagh (National Trust, of Northern Ireland); and the Petit hameau de la Reine at Versailles.

Gill Hall, near Dromore

Meanwhile, Gill Hall had become one of the most haunted houses in Ireland and was home to the "Beresford ghost story".

This took place on 14 October 1693 when John Power, 2nd Earl of Tyrone (1665–1693) told his friend, Nichola Sophia (1665/6–1712/13), the sister-in-law of Sir John Magill (d. 1700), youngest daughter of Hugh, 1st Lord Hamilton of Glenawly, wife to Sir Tristram Beresford, 3rd Baronet (1669–1701), and mother of Sir Marcus Beresford, 4th Baronet and 1st Viscount Tyrone, of his own death that day thus showing, as arranged, that there was life on the other side.

Part of the stable block remains but the house was destroyed over thirty years ago.

Descent of Gill Hall
Captain John Magill (McGill), was granted fairs at Loughan in 1669, and who died in 1677, via his only child, Susanna, to her son;
Sir John Johnston, Kt (dsps 1701), aka Sir John Magill, 1st and only Bt.
Johnston was High Sheriff 1660, changed his name to Magill, an MP, and was given an Irish Baronetcy in 1680. In February 1689 he was colonel of a company of volunteers. His first wife Elizabeth Hawkins was his sister's sister-in-law. His widow, his second wife, sister of Lady Beresford, having remarried, died in 1708 and is buried in Westminster Abbey.
Sir John Magill's only daughter (born 1684): 'by the negligence of a servant was killed when an infant, by a fall from a scaffold at Gill Hall' (another possible ghost source).
Renowned Dublin silversmith Robert Calderwood (c 1706–1766) was a nephew. (Magill's sister was Calderwood's mother). Accordingly, Calderwood (Dublin Goldsmiths Company, Warden: 1733-36, & Master: 1736-37) was patronised by his Gill Hall cousins.
Magill left Gill Hall to his elder sister's son (and his first wife's nephew);

John Hawkins (1675 – 5 September 1713), who also accordingly (in 1701, as instructed in his uncle's will) changed his name to Magill or Hawkins Magill. MP for County Down 1703–1713. High Sheriff for County Down 1700 and 1712. His father was granted a fair/market in Rathfriland in 1682, having been High Sheriff in 1675. His father was also an elder half-brother to Ulster King at Arms, William Hawkins. Two sons and a daughter (John, Hugh and Arabella Susanna (b&d 1698) died young. His surviving son, by his wife Rose, daughter of Sir Robert Colville, by Rose, daughter of William Leslie, MP, son of Henry Leslie, Bishop of Meath:

Robert Hawkins Magill (1704–1745 at Seaforde, 'during a great hunting party'); High Sheriff of County Down 1732; MP for County Down (1724–1745); Trustee of the Linen Board for Munster 1736-1745; foundation member of the Dublin Society 1731; his first wife (whom he married in 1728) was Rachael (died 13/14 April 1739), daughter of Clotworthy (Skeffington), 3rd Viscount Massereene, and granddaughter of Sir Edward Hungerford, KB, (after whom today's Hungerford Bridge is named) she was the widow of Randal (Mac Donnell), 4th Earl of Antrim (1680–1721), whom she had married in 1699;
left it to his daughter, by his second wife (Anne Bligh);

Theodosia Hawkins Magill, aka Theodosia, Countess of Clanwilliam.

Heraldic note
Hawkins of Rathfriland (Alderman Hawkins (d.1680): per chevron argent and vert three hinds trippant proper.
crest: a falcon rising proper, belled or, perched on a lure gold.
motto: providence with adventure (also for Hawkins' in Scotland).

Magill (for John Mac Gill, died 1677): azure three doves argent.
 (cf. Makgill/M'Gill/Mac Gill (of Kembach/Rankeillour, Fife): gules three martlets argent.
motto: In Domino confido. crest: a martlet argent).

Hawkins Magill (for John (formerly Hawkins) Magill 1701): quarterly 1st and 4th, azure three pewits argent (for Magill), 2nd and 3rd per chevron argent and vert three hinds trippant (for Hawkins).
crest: a falcon standing on a hawk's lure both proper argent and vert.

Meade (of Ballintobber): gules, a chevron ermine between three trefoils slipped argent;
crest: an eagle displayed with two heads sable, armed or.
motto: Toujours prest.

Meade (of Earsham and Burrenwood):
quarterly, 1st and 4th, grand quarters, gules, a chevron ermine between three trefoils slipped argent (Meade); 2nd and 3rd, grand quarters, quarterly 1st and 4th, azure, three peewits argent (Magill); 2nd and 3rd, per chevron and vert, three hinds trippant proper (Hawkins) a crest for difference.
Mantling: gules and argent.

Ancestry

References

A. P. W. Malcolmson 1999. Familia, no. 15.

Bernard Burke, Sir, CB, LLD, 1884. The general armoury of England, Scotland, Ireland and Wales, Ulster King at Arms, Harrison, London.
Edith Mary Johnston-Liik, 2002, History of the Irish Parliament, 1692-1800, six volumes, Ulster History Foundation.
Esme Wingfield-Stratford, 1959. The Lords of Cobham Hall, Cassell, London.
G. E. Cokayne (ed.), 1904, Complete Baronetage, Exeter.
G. E. Cokayne (ed.), The Complete Peerage volume III.
G. E. Cokayne (ed.), The Complete Peerage (G.E.C.), et al., volume VII, page 452, note d (description of ghost story).
Grace Dorothea Meade (1902–1977), 1937-11-21, Houses of Ulster transcript, BBC.
Hugh Montgomery-Massingberd (ed.), 1976, Burke's Irish Family Records, Burke's Peerage Ltd..
T. C. & E. C. Jack, 1905. Fairbairn's Book of Crests of the Families of Great Britain and Ireland, 4th edition, 2 vols., London, & Edinburgh.

Notes

External links
Ulster Museum's 1765 Reynolds portrait of Theodosia Magill.
Art Fund's superior reproduction of the above painting.
Ulster Museum's 1765 Gainsborough portrait of Theodosia Magill.
The Beresford ghost story, October 1693.
Gill Hall, old photo of it.
1775 Ewer in the Ulster Museum, bearing the arms of Clanwilliam.

1743 births
1817 deaths
Theodosia
18th-century British women
18th-century Irish women
Clanwilliam, Theodosia
18th-century Irish landowners
People from County Down
19th-century Irish landowners